Jean Plumier (born 17 January 1909, date of death unknown) was a Belgian fencer. He competed in the team épée event at the 1936 Summer Olympics.

References

1909 births
Year of death missing
Belgian male fencers
Olympic fencers of Belgium
Fencers at the 1936 Summer Olympics